Grant Nelson (born April 1971 in London), also known as Wishdokta, Bump & Flex and N'n'G, is an English DJ, remixer and record producer. In the 1990s, inspired by producers such as Masters at Work, MK and Eddie Perez, he played an important role in the development of the UK garage genre, being heralded as the "Godfather of UK Garage".

In 2013, Nelson appeared alongside many other garage pioneers in a documentary exploring the legacy of UK garage, Rewind 4Ever: The History of UK Garage.

Hit singles on the UK charts as Bump & Flex include "Long Time Coming" (UK #73, UK Dance #3) and "Got Myself Together" (UK #84, UK Dance #3), and as one half of N'n'G, he scored a No. 12 and No. 1 Dance hit with "Right Before My Eyes" in 2000.

Popular Bump & Flex remixes include Mis-Teeq's "B with Me" (UK #5), James Brown's "Funk on Ah Roll" (UK #40, UK Dance #1), Indo's "R U Sleeping" (UK #31, UK Dance #3) and the Steppers Dub of Nelson's "Step 2 Me" (featuring Jean McClain; UK #92, UK Dance #7).

References

External links
Grantnelson.co.uk Grant Nelson official website
Discogs Grant Nelson discography & remixography
Swing City Records Record label co-owned by Grant Nelson

1971 births
Living people
English electronic musicians
English DJs
English record producers
Remixers
Club DJs
English house musicians
DJs from London
Breakbeat hardcore musicians
Happy hardcore musicians
UK garage musicians
English radio personalities
Musicians from London
Electronic dance music DJs